Maydell is a surname. Notable people with the name include:

 Anna von Maydell (1861–1944), German-Baltic artist and metal beater
 Ernst von Maydell (Landrat) (1767–1843), Estonian Landrat
 Ernst von Maydell (1888–1960), German-Baltic graphic designer
 Bernd Baron von Maydell (1934–2018), German lawyer and university professor in social law.
 Eva Maydell (born 1986), Bulgarian politician
 Sabine von Maydell (born 1955), German television actress 
 Eveline Adelheid von Maydell (née Frank, 1890–1962), German silhouette artist
 Viktor von Maydell (1833–1898), Baltic German railway engineer and former mayor of Reval (now Tallinn)

See also 
 House of Maydell

Surnames